Santo Tomás is a corregimiento in Alanje District, Chiriquí Province, Panama. Its population as of 1990 was 721; its population as of 2000 was 840.

References

Corregimientos of Chiriquí Province